Fabrizio Manfredi (born 20 December 1967) is an Italian voice actor.

Biography
Manfredi often contributes to voicing characters in cartoons, anime, movies, and other content. He is well known for providing the voice of the character Philip J. Fry in the Italian-language version of the animated sitcom Futurama. He also voiced the character Carl Chryniszzswics in the Italian-language version of the Cartoon Network animated series Johnny Bravo, as well Megavolt in the Italian dub of Darkwing Duck and Tyler in the Italian-language version of the Canadian animated franchise Total Drama.

He was married to voice actress Francesca Fiorentini until 2017. He works at C.D. Cine Dubbing, Sefit - CDC, and other dubbing studios in Italy

Dubbing roles

Animation
 Philip J. Fry in Futurama
 Philip J. Fry in Futurama: Bender's Big Score
 Philip J. Fry in Futurama: The Beast with a Billion Backs
 Philip J. Fry in Futurama: Bender's Game
 Philip J. Fry in Futurama: Into the Wild Green Yonder
 Tyler in Total Drama Island
 Tyler in Total Drama World Tour
 Kyle Broflovski (Second voice) and Pip Pirrup (First voice) in South Park (First dub)
 Kyle Broflovski in South Park: Bigger, Longer & Uncut
 Mole in The Animals of Farthing Wood
 Kaname Ohgi in Code Geass: Lelouch of the Rebellion
 Kaname Ohgi in Code Geass: Lelouch of the Rebellion R2
 Keisuke Takahashi in Initial D
 Hikaru Matsuyama in Captain Tsubasa
 Zazie the Beast in Trigun
 Arthur in Georgie!
 Inuzuka Shino Moritaka in The Hakkenden
 Bagheera in The Jungle Book (TV series)
 Megavolt in Darkwing Duck
 Henry Pym/Ant-Man/Giant-Man in The Avengers: Earth's Mightiest Heroes
 Mario in Denver, the Last Dinosaur
 Shiro Kabuto in Mazinger Z
 Rock in Metropolis
 Carl Chryniszzswics in Johnny Bravo
 Brother Tuck in Young Robin Hood
 Private/Corporal/Sergeant/Lieutenant Juan "Johnny" Rico in Roughnecks: Starship Troopers Chronicles
 Derek (speaking voice) in The Swan Princess
 Derek in The Swan Princess II: Escape from Castle Mountain
 Derek in The Swan Princess: The Mystery of the Enchanted Kingdom
 Van Fanal in The Vision of Escaflowne
 Lai in Sorcerous Stabber Orphen
 Rattrap in Beast Machines

Live action
 Joe Bennett in Lipstick Jungle
 Julian "Dice" Blac in Glitter
 Theodore Aloysius "Theo" Huxtable in The Cosby Show
 Frank Churchill in Emma
 Billy Brennan in Jurassic Park III
 Sean Boswell in The Fast and the Furious: Tokyo Drift
 Edward Scissorhands in Edward Scissorhands
 Edward "Ned" T. Malone in Sir Arthur Conan Doyle's The Lost World
 Percy Wetmore in The Green Mile
 Glenn Morrison in Trauma (U.S. TV series)
 Jim Moriarty in Sherlock (TV series)
 Henry Denton in Gosford Park
 Michael Aaron "Mike" Seaver in Growing Pains
 Dr. Douglas "Doogie" Howser in Doogie Howser, M.D.
 Ricky Butler in The 'Burbs
 Detective I Paul Diskant in Street Kings
 Barry in Fly Away Home
 Zachary "Zack" Siler in She's All That
 Tom Jeter in Studio 60 on the Sunset Strip
 Rusty in The Adventures of Rin Tin Tin (Second dub)
 Nikolai in Jennifer's Body
 Horstmayer in Joyeux Noël
 Bob Sugar in Jerry Maguire
 Kruger in Jarhead

Video games
 Philip J. Fry in Futurama

Work as a dubbing director
 Conan the Barbarian (2011 film)
 Outside the Law (2010 film)
 Shredderman Rules
 Who Is Cletis Tout?
 The Devil's Rejects
 Judging Amy
 Line of Fire (2003 TV series)
 Heist (TV series)

References

External links
 

1967 births
Living people
Male actors from Rome
Italian male voice actors
Italian voice directors
20th-century Italian male actors
21st-century Italian male actors